Below is a list of current NBL Canada team rosters:

Atlantic Division 
There are a total of 5 teams in the Atlantic Division.

Cape Breton Highlanders

Halifax Hurricanes

Island Storm

Moncton Magic

Saint John Riptide

Central Division 
There are a total of 5 teams in the Central Division.

KW Titans

London Lightning

St. John's Edge

Sudbury Five

Windsor Express

References 

roster